Rowel Merto (born 12 December 1961) is a Filipino archer. He competed in the men's individual event at the 1988 Summer Olympics.

References

External links
 

1961 births
Living people
Filipino male archers
Olympic archers of the Philippines
Archers at the 1988 Summer Olympics
Place of birth missing (living people)